Chelmarsh is a civil parish in Shropshire, England.  It contains four listed buildings that are recorded in the National Heritage List for England.  Of these, one is listed at Grade I, the highest of the three grades, and the others are at Grade II, the lowest grade. The parish contains the village of Chelmarsh and smaller settlements, and is otherwise entirely rural.  The listed buildings consist of a church and three houses.



Key

Buildings

References

Citations

Sources

Lists of buildings and structures in Shropshire